Maxime De Bie (born 13 December 2000) is a Belgian professional footballer who plays as a defender for Lierse Kempenzonen.

Career
De Bie was sent on a season-long loan to Helmond Sport on 15 August 2020 as part of a new cooperation agreement between his club Mechelen and Helmond Sport. He made his professional debut in on 29 August 2020, in the 2–1 away win over TOP Oss. He came on for Lance Duijvestijn in the 83rd minute. He scored his first goal on 2 January 2021 in a 5–2 win over FC Dordrecht; a header off a corner from Karim Loukili.

In July 2021, De Bie's loan deal with Helmond Sport was extended by another year, keeping him in North Brabant until 2022.

On 12 May 2022, De Bie signed a one-season contract with Lierse Kempenzonen.

Personal life
De Bie has worked as a fashion photographer next to being as a professional footballer, taking photos for his mother's online shop.

Career statistics

Club

Notes

References

2000 births
Living people
Footballers from Antwerp
Belgian footballers
Belgium youth international footballers
Belgian expatriate footballers
Association football defenders
K. Lyra players
Lierse S.K. players
K.V. Mechelen players
Helmond Sport players
Lierse Kempenzonen players
Eerste Divisie players
Belgian expatriate sportspeople in the Netherlands
Expatriate footballers in the Netherlands